Barstow is a census-designated place (CDP) and unincorporated community in Ferry County in the U.S. state of Washington. As of the 2010 census it had a population of 59.

Geography
Barstow is located in northeastern Ferry County, along U.S. Route 395 on the west side of the Kettle River. US 395 leads south  to Kettle Falls and north  to the Canadian border at Laurier.

Cougar attack
In 1999, a four-year-old boy was injured in a cougar attack near a house "on U.S. Highway 395 about a mile south of Barstow in Ferry County and about 11 miles northwest of Kettle Falls."

References

Census-designated places in Ferry County, Washington
Census-designated places in Washington (state)
Unincorporated communities in Washington (state)
Unincorporated communities in Ferry County, Washington
Populated places in the Okanagan Country